The Maly Irgiz is a river in Saratov Oblast, Russia, a left tributary of the Volga. The river is fed by snow. Above Seleznikha Maly Irgiz dries up systematically (up to 305 days per year without drainage). Between November and April the Maly Irgiz is frozen.

References 

Rivers of Saratov Oblast